Mirza Mohammad Ashtiani (died 1873), also known as Qavam al-Dawla, was the governor of Khorasan and Fars and a member of the Mostowfian Ashtiani family. Qavam al-Dawla is best known for his defeat in the Merv war against Teke Turkmen tribe.

He entered the government service during the reign of Fath Ali Shah and during the reign of Nasser al-Din Shah, he achieved high ranks and was appointed governor of Khorasan.

In 1862, Nasser al-Din Shah ordered his uncle Heshmat al-Dawla, along with Qavam al-Dawla, to seize the bases of the Turkmen insurgents, who from time to time attacked Khorasan, looting the people and creating insecurity. But Qavam al-Dawla and his forces were severely defeated and returned to Tehran. Nasser al-Din Shah removed him and Heshmat al-Dawla from their posts, imprisoned Qavam al-Dawla as the main culprit, and even tried to kill him. But Mirza Yusuf Ashtiani, brother-in-law of Qavam al-Dawla, presented 100,000 Tomans in a golden tray to Naser al-Din Shah and demanded the release of Qavam al-Dawla. Nasser al-Din Shah released Qavam al-Dawlah and appointed him governor of Fars.

Qavam al-Dawlah married twice, his first wife being the daughter of Mirza Mayel Ashtiani, the son of Kazem Ashtiani, from whom he had a son named Ibrahim Motamed al-Saltanah, who was the father of Ahmad Qavam and Vossug ed Dowleh. His second marriage was to Asmat al-Saltanah, daughter of Farhad Mirza, son of Abbas Mirza, from whom he had two children.

Genealogy

References 

1873 deaths
Year of birth unknown
Mostowfian Ashtiani family
19th-century Iranian politicians
People of Qajar Iran